JudoScotland is the national governing body for judo in Scotland. It was founded in 1988 to represent Scottish judoka, coaches, referees and officials, clubs and the Scottish National Judo Team. JudoScotland is the sportscotland recognised governing body for the Olympic sport of Judo within Scotland. It is currently situated in Edinburgh International Climbing Arena (EICA) in Ratho.

JudoScotland is capitalising on the opportunities presented by the London Olympic Games in 2012 and the forthcoming Glasgow Commonwealth Games in 2014 to expand the participation in judo in Scotland through its Izou 2014 Strategic Plan.

Notable Athletes

Olympians
 Euan Burton

Euan was born on 31 March 1979. He fought in the Under 81 kg men category. He is currently a 5th Dan black belt. His best results include; 2010 World Championship bronze, 2010 Tokyo Grand Slam gold, and 2007 World Championship bronze.

Burton is mainly concentrating his efforts as a development coach for JudoScotland after his disappointing result at London 2012. Traditionally he fought in the -81 kg category but has recently moved up two weightings to fight in the -100 kg category to make the Scottish team for the Commonwealth Games. During the Bratislava European Cup and winning gold at this weight in Belgrade and winning the Glasgow 2013 European cup. This secured him the title of second eldest European Cup winner. He is now retired 

Sally Conway

Conway was born 1 February 1987. She fights in the Under 70 kg females category. She is currently a 1st Dan black belt. Her best results include; 2011 IJF Samoa World Up Gold, 2009 World Championship 5th, and 2006 Junior World Championship Silver.

Conway is originally from Bristol but moved to Edinburgh in 2005. She is seen as one of Britain's most physical judoka. She started judo as a result of her dad founding a club and taking her along. Her hidden talent is Baking.

Christopher Sherrington

Sherrington was born on 21 October 1983. He fights in the open weight of over 100 kg males category. Christopher is a 1st Dan black belt. His best results include; 2011 Samoa World Cup gold, 2005 British Open gold, and 2010 Swedish European Cup bronze.

As well as an elite judoka, Christopher Sherrington is a Royal Marine. He started participating in judo because the Royal Marines encourage competitive sport for extra physical training and team building.

Sarah Clark

Clark was born on 3 January 1978. She fights in the under 57 kg females category. She is currently a 5th Dan black belt. Her best results include; 2009 European Championship Silver, 2006 European Championship Gold, and 2004 European Championship Bronze.

Clark got her 1st Dan black belt at the young age of 15. She is the oldest female on the British judo team. Her favourite technique is left-handed uchimata which she worked on when she suffered a broken arm in 2009, which required surgery. Sarah has fought in the 2004, 2008 and 2012 Olympic games for Great Britain.

Notable Judoka
 George Kerr

In 2002 George Kerr was named one of the original members of the Scottish Sports Hall of Fame. He is referred to as Mr.judo. In 2001 he became president of the British Judo Association.

In 2010, he was awarded the grade 10th Dan by the International Judo Federation (IJF) for dedicating his life to judo and for his service to the international judo federation. He is currently the only living IJF jūdan.

In 2011, he was appointed Commander of the Order of the British Empire (CBE) in the years New Year Honours list.

George has taught judo in Edinburgh for two years shy of half a century. He founded the Edinburgh Club and has taught generations of kids respectful combat in their jammies.

 Graeme Randall

Randall was born on 14 March 1975. His judo career started at the early age of 12 and just three years later he was awarded his  black belt. By the age of 19 he had become the Junior European Champion and won the Junior World bronze medal in the same year, while studying at the University of Edinburgh.

He continued his rise on the world stage, eventually winning the 1999 World Championship to become Scotland’s first and, currently, only Judo World Champion and then in 2002 he won a gold medal for Scotland at the Commonwealth Games.

By that time Graeme had represented Scotland over 100 times. He represented Great Britain at the 1996 and 2000 Olympic Games and the 1997, 1999 and 2001 World Championships.

In 2002 he announced his retirement from the sport. Graeme was awarded an MBE in 2001 for his services to judo, and in recognition of his outstanding level of competitive performance, was awarded the prestigious honour of the sixth Dan. He is Scotland’s most successful judoka, he became one of the youngest players to be awarded the grade.

Events

Men's European Cup Event 2013
Glasgow was chosen to host a men's European Cup Event in October 2013. The European Cup events are prestigious events which players can gain points to improve their world rank. The Glasgow European Open was held in the Emirates Arena with judoka from 24 different nations taking part.
Day one saw -60 kg, -66 kg and -73 kg judoka in action. JudoScotlands’s Patrick Dawson fought in -73 kg and achieved a 7th place. Day two saw -81 kg, -90 kg, -100 kg and +100 kg fights take place. JudoScotland's Matthew Purssey finished with a bronze in the -90 kg category, James Austin finished in 7th place in the -100 kg, Chris Sherrington lost the bronze fight therefore finishing with a 5th place in the +100 kg category and Euan Burton won the gold medal in his new category -100 kg. Glasgow will host the Women's European Cup Event in 2014 shortly after the Commonwealth Games.

Commonwealth Games 2014
Popularity for the 2014 Commonwealth Games in Glasgow is growing exponentially as the day of the opening ceremony quickly approaches. Approximately 92% of the total number of tickets available - for the 11 days of sporting events - have already sold out; with judo and athletics, as well as various other sporting disciplines proving popular amongst supporters of the host and commonwealth nations.
 
The popularity of judo amongst the host-nation supporters is due to the Glasgow European Open, which took place in October 2013. The event was the largest judo tournament held in Scotland to date, however, this was not the main aim of the event; it was to increase the popularity of judo with the Glasgow’s citizens, in the hope of increasing the number of people getting involved in the sport as well as to gain more supporters in the run-up to the Commonwealth Games.

European Championships 2015
On 27 June 2013 the British Judo Association announced that Glasgow is to host the 2015 European Judo Championships.
It will be the first time in 20 years the European Judo Union's biggest event of the Judo year will be hosted in the United Kingdom, and is set to be held at the Emirates Arena.

Sport Minister Shona Robison said: "Securing the 2015 European Judo Championships is a fantastic achievement. Judo is going from strength to strength, with JudoScotland continuing to grow its membership and the National Training Centre at Ratho supporting more athletes and development programmes. Scotland is the perfect stage for events - judokas and spectators coming to Glasgow will receive a great welcome and an experience that will surprise and delight. The European Judo Championships now join other major championships, such as world gymnastics and orienteering events, coming to Scotland after next year's Commonwealth Games and the Ryder Cup."

Kerrith Brown, British Judo's current Chairman, hopes the Glasgow events will help further boost the sport's profile, with Gemma Gibbons (who now train's at JudoScotland's training centre in ratho) and Karina Bryant having won Olympic medals at London 2012. He said: "It is an honour to have been selected by the EJU to host their flagship event and I am extremely proud of what our bid team and partners have achieved. We are confident that this event will be something special and provide a showcase for European judo to the world, creating a legacy for Great Britain sitting on a par in judo terms with London 2012 and the 2014 Commonwealth Games."

References

External links
Judo Scotland website
Glasgow Commonwealth Games
British Judo

Sports organizations established in 1988
1988 establishments in the United Kingdom
1988 establishments in Scotland
Judo organizations
Sports governing bodies in Scotland
National members of the International Judo Federation